The Voice Kids is the junior version of The Voice Portugal, broadcast on RTP1, with competitors between the ages of seven and fifteen. The first season premiered on 28 September 2014, with Daniela Mercury, Anselmo Ralph, and Raquel Tavares as coaches, and was presented by Mariana Monteiro and Vasco Palmeirim. In April 2019, RTP1 announced a reboot for the kids' version. Starting in 2021, the second season features four new coaches: Carlão, Fernando Daniel, Carolina Deslandes, and Marisa Liz. The third season premiered on 8 May 2022 with Bárbara Tinoco replacing Liz, while Carlão, Daniel, and Deslandes continued on the show as coaches.

Since 2021, the competition has been used to select the artist that represents Portugal in the Junior Eurovision Song Contest.

Timeline of coaches and hosts

Coaches' teams and their artists 
 These are each of the coaches' teams throughout the seasons' live shows. Winners are in bold and finalists in italic.

Series overview 
Warning: the following table presents a significant amount of different colors.

Seasons' summary 
 Colour key

  Winner
  Runner-up
  Third place 
  Eliminated in the Final
  Eliminated in the Live shows
  Saved by another coach in the Battles 
  Eliminated in Battles

Season 1 (2014) 
The first season of the series had three coaches: Anselmo Ralph, fadista Raquel Tavares, and internationally known Brazilian singer, Daniela Mercury. Premiering on 28 September 2014, Mariana Monteiro and Vasco Palmeirim were the hosts for the season and Rui Maria Pêgo was the Backstage host. On 14 December, the season ended with Diogo Garcia from Team Daniela declared the winner.

Season 2 (2021) 
The second season of the series had Marisa Liz, hip hop singer Carlão, pop singer Carolina Deslandes, and adults' season four winner Fernando Daniel as coaches. Premiering on 10 January 2021, Catarina Furtado was the host for the season and actress Bárbara Lourenço was the Backstage host for the Blind auditions and Battles. For the Live shows, digital influencer Fábio Lopes replaced her. During the season finale, on 18 April, Furtado confirmed that the winner would represent Portugal in the Junior Eurovision Song Contest 2021. Simão Oliveira from Team Fernando won the season, making him the second stolen artist to win the show (overall), and eight months later, represented Portugal with the song "O Rapaz", placing 11th with 101 points.

Season 3 (2022) 

The third season of the series had Carlão, Deslandes, Daniel, and Festival da Canção 2020 participant Bárbara Tinoco as coaches. Premiering on 8 May 2022, Furtado returned as the host for the season and Lopes as the backstage host. On 31 July, 14-year-old Maria Gil from Team Fernando won the season. On 10 August, RTP announced that runner-up Nicolas Alves would represent Portugal in the Junior Eurovision Song Contest 2022, due to Gil being born in 2007.

Season 4 (2023) 
On 3 December 2022, applications for the fourth season of The Voice Kids opened. On 8 January 2023, during the live show of the tenth season of The Voice Portugal, it was revealed that Aurea would replace Deslandes on the coaching panel, while Carlão, Daniel, and Tinoco continued as coaches.

References

External links

The Voice Portugal
Portuguese-language television shows
2014 Portuguese television series debuts
2012 Portuguese television series endings
2010s Portuguese television series
2020s Portuguese television series